Euzébio Andrade Silva Neto (born 20 October 1990), commonly known as Euzébio Neto, is a Brazilian footballer currently playing for Desportivo Brasil.

Career
Euzébio signed for Miami FC in 2010 after playing for Desportivo Brasil and for one of Miami FC's sister clubs, Estoril, of Liga Vitalis in Portugal.

He made his debut for Miami on May 8, 2010 in a game against Carolina RailHawks.

References

External links 
 Miami FC bio
 

1990 births
Living people
Brazilian footballers
G.D. Estoril Praia players
Miami FC (2006) players
USSF Division 2 Professional League players
Desportivo Brasil players
Association football defenders
Brazilian expatriate footballers
Expatriate footballers in Portugal
Expatriate soccer players in the United States
Villa Nova Atlético Clube players
Paulista Futebol Clube players
Associação Olímpica de Itabaiana players